The 1909–10 Northern Football League season was the 21st in the history of the Northern Football League, a football competition in Northern England.

Clubs

The league featured 11 clubs which competed in the last season, along with one new club: 
 Knaresborough

League table

References

1909-10
1909–10 in English association football leagues